Jean "Skip" Ziegler (1920–1953) was a United States test pilot. He was killed in an explosion of the Bell X-2 during a test flight in 1953.

Biography 
Born in Endeavor, Pennsylvania, on January 1, 1920, he learnt to fly on his brother's Piper Cub before enlisting in the United States Army Air Forces, flying the Douglas C-47 over the "hump".

After his discharge in 1942, he became a test pilot for Curtiss-Wright, piloting C-46s, P-40 Warhawks as well as the XP-55 Ascender, his first experience on a flying wing. After a brief interlude as a commercial and race plane pilot and Bell rocket engineer, he went on to test North American planes F-86 Sabre, B-45 Tornado, AJ-1 Savage and T-28 Trojan before being selected to work on the Bell Aircraft X-5, X-1D, X-1A and X-2.

Jean Leroy Ziegler completed the first unpowered glide flight of an X-2 at Edwards Air Force Base on 27 June 1952.

Death 
On May 12, 1953, during a captive-carry flight test over Lake Ontario, X-2, serial number 46-675 suddenly exploded, killing Bell test pilot Jean Ziegler and observer Frank Wolko aboard the EB-50A mothership, which managed to land, although damaged, while the X-2 remains fell in the lake. Neither his body, nor Wolko's or the X-2 wreckage were ever retrieved.

Only after several other mysterious X-plane losses was the cause found to be a rocket engine gasket made of Ulmer leather, which decomposed and became explosively unstable after sustained exposure to liquid oxygen.

References

Bibliography

External links 
 This day in aviation. Jean Leroy Ziegler 27 June 1952 and 12 May 1953 flights

1920 births
1953 deaths
American test pilots
Aviators killed in aviation accidents or incidents in the United States
United States Army Air Forces personnel of World War II
Victims of aviation accidents or incidents in 1953